Watch Hill is a mountain in Barnstable County, Massachusetts. It is located southeast of Chatham in the Town of Chatham. Great Hill is located northwest of Watch Hill.

References

Mountains of Massachusetts
Mountains of Barnstable County, Massachusetts